The World Waveski Surfing Titles is the premier waveski championship organised by the World Waveski Surfing Association, with the recognition of the International Canoe Federation. The competition has been held since 1984 irregularly, with a span of 1–4 years between competitions. Having the full recognition of the ICF since 2018, this discipline is eligible to participate in the Olympic Games or World Games.

Medallists

References

Recurring sporting events established in 2000
World championships in canoeing and kayaking